Julio César León (born 2 February 1925) is a former cyclist from Venezuela who competed at the 1948 Summer Olympics in London. He was the first sportsperson from Venezuela to take part in the Olympic Games, He was eliminated in the second round of the sprint, being beaten by the eventual gold medalist, Italian Mario Ghella In the 1000 metres time trial, he finished 14th with a time of 1:18.1.

At the Cycling World Championships in France in 1947, León qualified for the top eight in the sprint with a time of 10.9 seconds. After the Olympics he joined the Italian team Bianchi. He once cycled from Caracas to Maracay in two hours and forty minutes. He broke the record for Team Pursuit with his teammate Domingo Rivas y Montilla in the Teo Capriles Velodrome at the National Institute of Sport with a time of 4 minutes, 40 seconds in the 4,000 m event at a rate of 1 minute and 10 seconds per kilometer. Julio César was a Bolivarian, Central American and Pan-American champion on two occasions and was also a champion in Chile Argentina and Uruguay.

In 1959, Caracas, Venezuela, hosted the Central American and Caribbean Games for the first time, and León went on to win the gold medal in the 1 Km track event and the silver medal in the track sprint.

León is an engineering graduate from the Central University of Venezuela (UCV). The Weight Training Gymnasium of the Ministry of Sports in Venezuela bears his name.

References

1925 births
Living people
Venezuelan male cyclists
Cyclists at the 1948 Summer Olympics
Olympic cyclists of Venezuela
Venezuelan track cyclists
People from Trujillo (state)
20th-century Venezuelan people